On Your Mark is an animated music video directed by Hayao Miyazaki. 

On Your Mark may also refer to:

 On Your Mark (film), a 2021 Chinese film directed by Chiu Keng Guan
 "On Your Mark" (song), a 1994 song by Chage and Aska
 "On Your Mark", a song by Sara Groves from the album Floodplain

See also
On Your Mark, Get Set...